In organic chemistry, a radical-substitution reaction is a substitution reaction involving free radicals as a reactive intermediate. 

The reaction always involves at least two steps, and possibly a third. 

In the first step called initiation (2,3), a free radical is created by homolysis. Homolysis can be brought about by heat or ultraviolet light, but also by radical initiators such as organic peroxides or azo compounds. UV Light is used to create two free radicals from one diatomic species. The final step is called termination (6,7), in which the radical recombines with another radical species. If the reaction is not terminated, but instead the radical group(s) go on to react further, the steps where new radicals are formed and then react are collectively known as propagation (4,5). This is because a new radical is created, able to participate in secondary reactions.

Radical substitution reactions 
In free radical halogenation reactions, radical substitution takes place with halogen reagents and alkane substrates. Another important class of radical substitutions involve aryl radicals. One example is the hydroxylation of benzene by Fenton's reagent. Many oxidation and reduction reactions in organic chemistry have free radical intermediates, for example the oxidation of aldehydes to carboxylic acids with chromic acid. Coupling reactions can also be considered radical substitutions. Certain aromatic substitutions takes place by radical-nucleophilic aromatic substitution. Auto-oxidation is a process responsible for deterioration of paints and food, as well as production of certain lab hazards such as diethyl ether peroxide. 

More radical substitutions are listed below:
 The Barton–McCombie deoxygenation involves substitution of a hydroxyl group for a proton.
 The Wohl–Ziegler reaction involves allylic bromination of alkenes.
 The Hunsdiecker reaction converts silver salts of carboxylic acids to alkyl halides.
 The Dowd–Beckwith reaction involves ring expansion of cyclic β-keto esters.
 The Barton reaction involves synthesis of nitrosoalcohols from nitrites.
 The Minisci reaction involves generation of an alkyl radical from a carboxylic acid and a silver salt, and subsequent substitution at an aromatic compound

References

Free radical reactions
Reaction mechanisms